Zveno may refer to:

 Zveno, a Bulgarian military and political organization
 Zveno (Soviet collective farming), a Soviet agricultural working unit
 Zveno (art), a Ukrainian group of artists
 Zveno project, a Soviet parasite fighter
Zveno, a sub-sub-unit of the "Young Pioneers" (Vladimir Lenin All-Union Pioneer Organization)